Vladimir Eljanov (8 May 1951 – 19 October 2013) was a Ukrainian chess International Master, Merited Coach of Ukraine, FIDE Senior Trainer (2013) and chess book publisher.

Family
His son is grandmaster Pavel Eljanov.

References

1951 births
2013 deaths
Sportspeople from Kharkiv
Chess International Masters
Ukrainian chess players
Ukrainian publishers (people)
Soviet chess players
Chess coaches
Merited Coaches of Ukraine